The 1977 Belgian Cup Final, took place on 12 June 1977 between Anderlecht and Club Brugge. It was the 22nd Belgian Cup final and only the first final in which Club Brugge and Anderlecht met each other. Club Brugge won the match 4-3.

Route to the final

Match

Summary
During the first half, Anderlecht scored from three long range shots, with Club Brugge barely managing to hang on and happy to go into the break only one goal down at 3-2. During the second half Roger Davies turned the tide as he scored twice to hand Club Brugge the cup.

Details

External links
  

1977
Cup Final
Club Brugge KV matches
R.S.C. Anderlecht matches